The List of United States Senate elections has been split into the following two parts for convenience:
 List of United States Senate elections (1788–1913)
 List of United States Senate elections (1914–present)

See also 
 List of elections in the United States